Don J. Vruwink (born June 12, 1952) is an American educator and Democratic politician.  He was a member of the Wisconsin State Assembly, representing the 43rd Assembly district from 2017 through 2022.

Biography
Vruwink grew up on a dairy farm near Auburndale, Wisconsin, and graduated from Auburndale High School in 1970. He received his bachelor's degree in Social Studies and Political Science from University of Wisconsin–Stevens Point and his master's degree in History from University of Wisconsin–Whitewater. Vruwink taught history and was a coach of football, basketball and softball at Milton High School in Milton, Wisconsin from 1979 to 2011. Although retired from full-time teaching, Vruwink serves as both a substitute teacher, and as a baseball and softball umpire. Vruwink is the former parks and recreation director for the City of Milton. From 2011 to 2015, Vruwink served on the Milton Common Council. In 2016, Vruwink served on the Milton School Board. Starting in 2017, Vruwink served in the Wisconsin State Assembly as a member of the Democratic Party. Vruwink currently serves on the Assembly's Agriculture, Education, Rural Development, and Tourism committees. He was also appointed to Governor Tony Evers' Dairy Task Force 2.0.

References

1952 births
Living people
People from Milton, Wisconsin
People from Auburndale, Wisconsin
University of Wisconsin–Stevens Point alumni
University of Wisconsin–Whitewater alumni
Educators from Wisconsin
Wisconsin city council members
School board members in Wisconsin
21st-century American politicians
Democratic Party members of the Wisconsin State Assembly